SM City Xiamen is a shopping centre in Xiamen city, Fujian province, China. It is owned by SM Prime Holdings, the largest retail and mall operator in the Philippines. It is the first SM Supermall on mainland China, which opened on December 13, 2001.

In Xiamen, it is aptly called "SM Laiya". It is located along Jiahe and Xianyue Road.

References 

Buildings and structures in Xiamen
Shopping malls established in 2001
Shopping malls in Xiamen
Xiamen
Tourist attractions in Xiamen